Germanicol synthase (RsM1, (S)-2,3-epoxysqualene mutase (cyclizing, germanicol-forming)) is an enzyme with systematic name (3S)-2,3-epoxy-2,3-dihydrosqualenee mutase (cyclizing, germanicol-forming). This enzyme catalyses the following chemical reaction

 (3S)-2,3-epoxy-2,3-dihydrosqualene  germanicol

The enzyme produces germanicol, beta-amyrin and lupeol.

References

External links 
 

EC 5.4.99